Euxoa setonia, the Seton lake dart, is a species of cutworm or dart moth in the family Noctuidae. It is found in North America.

The MONA or Hodges number for Euxoa setonia is 10794.

References

Further reading

 
 
 

Euxoa
Articles created by Qbugbot
Moths described in 1927